Saintongese may refer to:

 People from Saintonge, an area in western France
 Saintongeais, the Romance language spoken in and around Saintonge

See also
 Saintonge (disambiguation)